Saurauia latipetala is a species of plant in the Actinidiaceae family. It is found in Guatemala and Mexico. It is threatened by habitat loss.

References

latipetala
Vulnerable plants
Taxonomy articles created by Polbot